The Decolonization and Social Emancipation Movement (MDES) is a pro-independence political party in French Guiana.

Platform
The principal platform of the party is the demand for independence of Guiana, currently an overseas region and one of the 26 regions of France. They also consider the possibility of becoming an overseas territory, which is different from an overseas region.

Election participation
In 1998, the MDES obtained 3 seats in the regional elections with 8.6% of the vote. However, in the 2004 regional elections, the MDES list put forward by Maurice Pindard obtained only 6.55% of the vote and no seats. In 2012 parliamentary elections, the MDES obtained 17.30% of votes.

Alain Tien-Liong, who represented the Cayenne South-West constituency in the body, served as president of the General Council of French Guiana from 2004 to 2015.

In the 2022 French legislative election, MDES candidate Jean-Victor Castor was elected to represent French Guiana's 1st constituency in the National Assembly.

Rot Kozé 
The party runs a newspaper Rot Kozé (a French Guianese Creole term that means "Other speech"), which advocates for autonomy for French Guiana.

References

External links

1991 establishments in French Guiana
Nationalist parties in France
Nationalist parties in South America
Political parties established in 1991
Political parties in French Guiana
Separatism in France
Socialism in French Guiana
Socialist parties in France